Edward Whitford Greenman (January 26, 1840 – August 3, 1908) was an American politician, banker, merchant, and manufacturer who served one term as a U.S. Representative from New York from 1887 to 1889.

Early life
Born in Berlin, New York, Greenman attended the common schools and De Ruyter Academy, Alfred, New York.

Career
Greenman engaged in mercantile and manufacturing pursuits in Berlin and became town supervisor (1866–68).  He was clerk of Rensselaer County (1868–71) and deputy county clerk for ten years. In 1874, he moved to Troy, New York.

Elected as a Democrat to the Fiftieth Congress, Greenman served as United States Representative for the eighteenth district of New York (March 4, 1887 – March 3, 1889).  He was not a candidate for renomination in 1888.

Cashier of the Central National Bank of Troy, New York from 1888 to 1905, Greenman was also Cashier of the National City Bank of Troy from 1906 to 1908.

Death
Greenman died in Troy, New York, on August 3, 1908 (age 68 years, 190 days). He is interred at Oakwood Cemetery.

Family life
The son of Schuyler and Phebe Witford Greenman, he married Mary E. Moore on January 29, 1859.

References

External links

1840 births
1908 deaths
Democratic Party members of the United States House of Representatives from New York (state)
Town supervisors in New York (state)
Burials at Oakwood Cemetery (Troy, New York)
19th-century American politicians